Detonator theory may refer to:

Theories pertaining to the chemical process of detonation
In political science, a theory of insurrection likening political discontent to explosive material